The neighborhood and former village Bansong-dong (반송동) is located in Haeundae-gu, Busan, South Korea. It is named for the ban-song (Pinus densiflora for. Multicaulis) a small pine tree still plentiful in the area. Encircled by (and encircling) hills north of Mt. Jang (Jangsan, 장산) and away from the famous Haeundae Beach, Bansong-dong has not participated in the economic growth experienced elsewhere in Haeundae-gu. The population of the three administrative dong (Bansong 1-dong, Bansong 2-dong and Bansong 3-dong) which make up Bansong-dong is 59,000.

Accident

References 

Haeundae District
Neighbourhoods in Busan